Tenerus may refer to:
 Tenerus (son of Apollo), in ancient Greek religion and mythology, the Theban hero who was the son and prophet of Apollo, and whose mother was the Oceanid nymph Melia. 
 Tenereus (beetle), a genus of checkered beetles in the family Cleridae